The Antique Furnishings & Wooden Sculpture Museum of Milan is located on the first floor of the Sforza Castle ducal courtyard and it is part of the Sforza Castle's Civic Museum complex.

The itinerary is chronologically arranged from the 14th century to the modern times with a particular attention for the Italian and lombardic furniture history. One of the most important artifacts exposed in the museum is the Chamber of Griselda: a wooden room reconstructed with fifteenth century detached frescoes to create a scale replica of how it looked in its original location in the Roccabianca Castle near Parma.

The Italian 20th century furniture and the italian design are well represented by furniture signed Alberto Issel, Carlo Bugatti and Ettore Sottsass, while the 18th-century Italian school of cabinetmakers are well represented by several cabinets signed Giuseppe Maggiolini. Are also exposed religious furnishing from 16th–18th century and furniture of the noble families of Milan.

Several wooden sculptures and various decorative items, such  pottery or tableware including a tea set designed by Gio Ponti, are also displayed in the museum.

See also
Antique furniture
Sforza Castle

Gallery

Sources and links

Le città d'arte:Milano, Guide brevi Skira, ed.2008, autori vari. (Italian language edition)
New Layout for Exhibit of  15TH - 21ST Century Furnishings and Wooden Sculpture
Collections of Antique Furnishings and Art Collections on the First Floor of the Ducal Courtyard

Art museums and galleries in Milan
Sforza Castle
Decorative arts museums in Italy
Furniture museums
Wooden sculptures in Italy
Tourist attractions in Milan